Pregnancy-specific beta-1-glycoprotein 5 is a protein that in humans is encoded by the PSG5 gene.

References

Further reading